The genus Brunnichia, also known as redvine, ladies' eardrops, or buckwheat vine, are perennial woody vines native to the United States.

Redvine is a native species to the US and a favored plant for honey production by beekeepers.  In January 2019, the largest honey producer in Arkansas announced they were closing production due to damage to native wildflowers from the herbicide Dicamba, and possibly relocating to Mississippi. Redvine was specifically cited by the owner of Crooked Creek Bee Company as an example of native vegetation being destroyed leading to an inferior product.  

Redvine species are a pest when they grow within crops; for example, Brunnichia ovata is a significant problem in soybean crops in the Mississippi Delta.  It is an example for thigmotropism.  Usually thigmotropism occurs when plants grow around a surface, such as a wall, pot, or trellis. Climbing plants, such as vines, develop tendrils that coil around supporting objects. Touched cells produce auxin and transport it to untouched cells. Some untouched cells will then elongate faster so cell growth bends around the object. Some seedlings also exhibit triple response, caused by pulses of ethylene which cause the stem to thicken and curve to start growing horizontally.

References

Polygonaceae genera
Taxa named by Joseph Banks
Taxa named by Joseph Gaertner
Polygonaceae